The 2016–17 Indian Federation Cup group stage took place between 7 May 2017 and 12 May 2017. Aizawl and East Bengal qualified from group A, whereas Mohun Bagan and Bengaluru FC qualified from group B.

Group A

Fixtures and results

Group B

Fixtures and results

References

Group Stage